Patenggang Lake is a lake located in the area of natural tourist attractions in the southern Bandung city, West Java, Indonesia, to be exact it is in Ciwidey village. Located at an altitude of 1600 meters above sea level, this lake has a very exotic landscape. The lake is spread over an area ofabout 45,000 hectares and the surrounding nature reserve has an area of about 123,077.15 hectares. 

The lake is called Situ Patengan by the local society, as the pronunciation of patengan is too difficult to say in Sundanese patenggang. The lake and adjoining area is a popular tourist destination.

The label/name of the lake in maps.google.com is Situ Penganten which Penganten means newlywed couple.

Satellite Image 

Click here to view in Google Maps

References

Bandung Regency
Lakes of West Java
Tourist attractions in West Java